The 1895 Nebraska Bugeaters football team represented the University of Nebraska in the 1895 college football season. The team was coached by first-year head coach Charles Thomas and played their one home game at the "M" Street Park in Lincoln, Nebraska. They competed as members of the Western Interstate University Football Association.

Thomas spent two years as an assistant before being promoted to head coach following the departure of Frank Crawford at the conclusion of the 1894 season. After the season, Nebraska's second consecutive WIUFA conference championship, Thomas left to become the head coach at Arkansas.

Schedule

Coaching staff

Roster

Game summaries

at Sioux City AC

Nebraska's trip to Sioux City was the longest road trip in the program's young history, a record surpassed several times later in the season. Nebraska dominated the game, shutting out Sioux City and setting new program records for points scored and margin of victory.

at Butte AC

Nebraska again undertook its longest-ever road trip, traveling over 1,000 miles to Butte, Montana to face the Butte Athletic Club. Butte's ball control-heavy game plan meant Nebraska had only one possession in the game's first twenty minutes, and Butte led 12–0 by the half. A late Nebraska touchdown was not enough to overcome the early deficit.

at Denver AC

The third game between Nebraska and the Denver AC was considerably less emotional than the 1893 matchup, which resulted in Denver choosing to forfeit the contest during the second half. The Bugeaters used a strong run game to control the game and win 12–4.

at Omaha

Nebraska's first game against the University of Nebraska–Omaha was a resounding Bugeaters victory. NU led by 12 at halftime and scored 24 more unanswered points to win 36–0. This was the only game ever played between Nebraska and Omaha.

Missouri

Nebraska and Missouri met in Omaha to open the 1895 WIUFA season. The Bugeaters trailed 10–6 at halftime, but scored the second half's only touchdown to win 12–10.

University of Missouri records suggest the final score of this game was a 12–0 Nebraska victory.

Kansas

Nebraska failed to take advantage of several first-half scoring opportunities, and the game reached halftime tied at zero. Both teams scored a touchdown and missed the following field kick, tying the game at four. Near the end of the game, Nebraska's players reportedly became confused about the amount of time remaining and eased back on their defensive effort, allowing Kansas to score the game-winning touchdown.

at Doane

Nebraska traveled to Crete to meet Doane for the seventh time, dominating the game en route to a 24–0 victory. Wins over Doane and Omaha allowed the Bugeaters to claim a third unofficial Nebraska state championship.

at Grinnell

A year after a 22–0 Nebraska win over Grinnell, the Pioneers returned the favor, shutting out the favored Bugeaters 24–0.

Iowa

By 1895, the Nebraska-Iowa contest was being held annually on Thanksgiving Day. The 1895 iteration was a defensive struggle, remaining scoreless until a second-half NU touchdown and subsequent field kick gave the Bugeaters a 6–0 win. The Bugeaters victory, combined with Missouri's defeat of Kansas, resulted in a three-way tie for the WIUFA championship. The tie-breaking system of the time awarded the conference pennant to the team that had allowed the fewest points on the season; this method of selection left Nebraska in third place, but the university later claimed the conference title.

University of Iowa records suggest that this game was played on November 19, 1895.

References

Nebraska
Nebraska Cornhuskers football seasons
Nebraska Bugeaters football